Copelatus aethiopicus is a species of diving beetle. It is part of the genus Copelatus in the subfamily Copelatinae of the family Dytiscidae. It was described by Régimbart in 1906.

References

aethiopicus
Beetles described in 1906